Tikhoretsky District is an administrative district (raion), one of the thirty-eight in Krasnodar Krai, Russia. As a municipal division, it is incorporated as Tikhoretsky Municipal District. It is located in the northeastern central part of the krai. The area of the district is .Its administrative center is the town of Tikhoretsk (which is not administratively a part of the district). Population:

Administrative and municipal status
Within the framework of administrative divisions, Tikhoretsky District is one of the thirty-eight in the krai. The town of Tikhoretsk serves as its administrative center, despite being incorporated separately as an administrative unit with the status equal to that of the districts (and which, in addition to Tikhoretsk, also includes two rural localities).

As a municipal division, the district is incorporated as Tikhoretsky Municipal District, with the Town of Tikhoretsk being incorporated within it as Tikhoretskoye Urban Settlement.

References

Notes

Sources

Districts of Krasnodar Krai
